This tournament is an annual pre-season football tournament for teams from the Icelandic men's premier division (Úrvalsdeild karla).

Groups

Group A

Group B

Semifinals

Final

References

Football in Iceland